Eitan Aharoni (born 21 December 1962) is an Israeli former footballer who played as a defender.

Personal life
Eitan's son Yohai is also a footballer as is his nephew, Eden Ben Basat.

Honours
Maccabi Haifa
 Israeli Premier League: 1983–84, 1984–85, 1988–89, 1990–91, 1993–94; runner-up: 1985–86
 State Cup: 1990–91, 1992–93; runner-up 1984–85, 1986–87, 1988–89
 Toto Cup: 1993–94

References

1962 births
Living people
Israeli Jews
People from Tzrufa
Israeli footballers
Association football defenders
Israel international footballers
Liga Leumit players
Maccabi Haifa F.C. players
Hapoel Kfar Saba F.C. players
Hapoel Haifa F.C. players